Stadion Bonchuk is a multi-use stadium in Dupnitsa, Bulgaria. It is used mostly for football matches and is the home ground of Marek Dupnitsa. The stadium has seating capacity for 16,050 people.

Bonchuk stadium is a notable one in Bulgarian football, as it has hosted many notable European teams, including German giants Bayern Munich, Scottish team Aberdeen, and Hungarian powerhouse Ferencvárosi TC. All of these games ended with wins for Marek.

External links

 StadiumDB pictures

Football venues in Bulgaria
Dupnitsa
Buildings and structures in Kyustendil Province